This is a list of people from the Mauricie region of Quebec, Canada.

Gaétan Barrette – Quebec politician
Nérée Beauchemin – poet and physician
Éric Bédard – short track speed skater
Steve Bégin – hockey player
Jean Béliveau – hockey player
Peter Blaikie – a prominent lawyer
Bruno Bordeleau – doctor, mayor, member of Quebec parliament and registrar
Jacques J. Bouchard – strongly involved in his community, he received the Order of Canada
Julie Boulet – politician, member of Quebec parliament
Michaël Bournival – National Hockey League player
Antoine Ephrem Cartier – 19th-century businessman of Ludington, Michigan
Aline Chrétien – wife of Jean Chrétien
Jean Chrétien – Prime Minister of Canada
Raymond Chrétien – ambassador
Sylvain Cossette – singer-songwriter
Antoine Dufour – acoustic guitarist
Paul Dumont – founding father of the Quebec Major Junior Hockey League
Louise Forestier – singer and actress
Maurice Duplessis – Premier of Quebec
Madeleine Ferron – writer
Marcelle Ferron – artist
Gratien Gélinas – playwright and actor
Martin Gélinas – National Hockey League player
Antoine Gérin-Lajoie – poet and novelist
Gérald Godin – poet and politician
Yanni Gourde – National Hockey League player
Josaphat Groleau – businessman in lumber industry, mayor
Maude Guérin – actress
Ezekiel Hart – businessman, first Jew elected to an official position of the British Empire
Pauline Julien – singer-songwriter
Pierre Labrie – poet
Jacques Lacoursière – historian
Carole Laure – actress
Félix Leclerc – singer-songwriter
Louis-Onésime Loranger – a Canadian politician
Maxime Masson – Roman catholic priest
Laurent Naud – businessman in lumber industry and commerce
Bryan Perro – writer
Jacques Plante – National Hockey League player
Andre Pronovost – National Hockey League player
Yvon Rivard – writer
Sylvie Roy – politician
James Renald – musician
Alphée Saint-Amand – mayor, fire chief, chief ambulance, funeral, garage owner, corporate and textile trader leader
Camil Samson – leader of the Ralliement créditiste du Québec
Marcel Trudel – Quebec historian
Doris Veillette – journalist
Georges W. Veillette – businessman
Jean Veillet (1664–1741) – French and Canadian ancestor of all the Veillet/te(s) of America
Jeffrey Veillet – businessman
Martin Veillette – theologian, philosopher, sociologist, and teacher
Michel Veillette – Canadian politician in Quebec
Omer Veillette – businessman
Claude Wagner – politician
Henri Wittmann – linguist

See also
Lists of people from Quebec by region
Trois-Rivières
List of Quebec regions

 
Mauricie